Deir ʿAsfīn ("Convent of Deviation") was a former monastery in Ottoman Palestine located just north of Tira in present-day Israel. It has also been identified as the location of the Theraspis that appears on the Madaba Map of 6th-century Byzantine Palestine.

References

Citations

Bibliography 
 .
 .
 .

Hills of Israel
Monasteries